Counter-Attack is a 1945 American war film directed by Zoltan Korda and starring Paul Muni and Marguerite Chapman as two Russians trapped in a collapsed building with seven enemy German soldiers during World War II. It was adapted from the 1944 Broadway play Counterattack by Janet and Philip Stevenson, which was in turn based on the play Pobyeda by Mikhail Ruderman and Ilya Vershinin.

Plot
In 1942, both Nazi Germany and the Soviet Union are gathering forces and supplies in one particular sector of the Eastern Front for a major attack. By night, the Soviets are secretly constructing a bridge across a river. To avoid detection, it is being built underwater, 500mm (20 inches) below the surface.

In an attempt to find out where the Germans plan to strike, Colonel Semenov (George Macready) has a small paratrooper unit dropped behind enemy lines to attack a divisional headquarters and hopefully take an officer prisoner for interrogation. The local partisans, led by the wily Kostyuk (Roman Bohnen), provide a guide, Lisa Elenko (Marguerite Chapman).

The attack succeeds at first. Alexei Kulkov (Paul Muni), one of the paratroopers, takes seven Germans prisoner in the basement. Then, just as Elenko brings him a message, German artillery hits the building, causing part of it to collapse. They are trapped in the spacious cellar.

Kulkov is in no hurry to dig out. Though the prisoners rank no higher than a sergeant, he is convinced one of them is an officer in disguise, based on a monogrammed pistol and a monocle he has found. He begins questioning the men one by one, but while he rules out ex-miner Stillman (Rudolph Anders) and a former magician (Philip Van Zandt), he cannot pinpoint his man.

Meanwhile, Kulkov's dog sniffs out where his master is buried and starts digging. This alerts one of Kulkov's comrades, who communicates with him by tapping on a metal pipe in code. Told that Kulkov has caught an officer, he leaves to get help.

An eighth German soldier, thought to be dead, wakes up and attacks. In the struggle, the lone lantern is extinguished and Elenko is stabbed in the shoulder. However, Kulkov kills the man and regains control of the situation. Oddly, Elenko is certain that one of the Germans tried to help her in the darkness.

Kulkov decides to try a ploy. He orders the magician to go around the corner of the main room out of sight of the others. He knocks the German out and then fires one round, making the rest think he has exacted revenge for the attack. He repeats the charade with the defiant sergeant (Ivan Triesault). The third man Kulkov picks admits he is Major Erich von Sturmer (Harro Meller). Stillman cannot hide his anger against the major for allowing two of his men to be "shot" before revealing his identity.

A cat and mouse game ensues, as Kulkov and von Sturmer try to extract from the other the enemy's plans. Finally, they make a deal; as each is confident of being rescued by his own side, he will reveal what he knows. Kulkov cleverly tells the truth, but in such a way that von Sturmer does not believe him. But then, during a heated exchange, Kulkov reveals the secret of the bridge.

When Elenko weakens, Kulkov has to guard the prisoners by himself without rest. She urges him to kill them immediately, but Kulkov refuses, hoping he can find out what he came for. Finally, he dozes off, but is awakened by a shout from Stillman, who joins the Russians. He is given a rifle (shown in the end to have no bullets) to stand guard, though Kulkov is careful to stay behind him.

Then, digging is heard. To Kulkov's dismay, he hears German voices. Von Sturmer taunts him, revealing the truth about the German attack and boasting about his earlier lie. When he rushes to the blocked entrance, Kulkov shoots him and prepares to kill everyone else. But to his delight, his dog is first through the opening in the rubble. The Germans digging were prisoners; the Soviets have launched their offensive and reached the building. Kulkov passes along the vital information he has obtained from von Sturmer to Colonel Semenov before falling asleep.

Cast

 Paul Muni as Alexei Kulkov
 Marguerite Chapman as Lisa Elenko
 Larry Parks as Kirichenko
 Harro Meller as Ernemann / Major Erich von Sturmer
 Roman Bohnen as Kostyuk
 George Macready as Colonel Semenov
 Erik Rolf as Vassilev
 Ludwig Donath as Corporal "the Professor" Müller
 Rudolph Anders as Stillman
 Philip Van Zandt as Galkronye
 Frederick Giermann as Ludwig Weiler
 Wolfgang Zilzer as Krafft (as Paul Andor)
 Ivan Triesault as Sergeant Johann Grillparzer
 Louis Adlon as Huebsch
 Darren McGavin as Paratrooper (uncredited)

Reception
Counter-Attack was a critical success but a box-office failure, probably because the war ended in Europe soon after it was released. As the Cold War developed, the fact that Soviet Union was depicted sympathetically began to be seen as inappropriate and suspicious, and three writers, one actor, and the production supervisor of the movie were blacklisted due to suspected Communist affiliations.

References

External links
 
 
 
 

1945 films
American black-and-white films
Eastern Front of World War II films
American films based on plays
Films directed by Zoltán Korda
World War II films made in wartime
Columbia Pictures films
American war films
1940s war films
1940s English-language films